The 2014 Copa do Brasil (officially the 2014 Copa Sadia do Brasil for sponsorship reasons) was the 26th edition of the Copa do Brasil football competition.  The competition was contested by 87 teams, either qualified through participating their respective state championships (71), by the CBF Rankings (10) or those qualified for 2014 Copa Libertadores (6). Clubs that qualify for the 2014 Copa Libertadores enter the competition in the 4th stage. The best seven teams of the 2013 Brazilian Championship eliminated until the third round qualified for the 2014 Copa Sudamericana.

Format
The competition is a single elimination knockout tournament featuring two-legged ties. In the first two rounds, if the away team wins the first match by 2 or more goals, it progresses straight to the next round avoiding the second leg. The away goals rule is also used in the Copa do Brasil. The winner qualifies for the 2015 Copa Libertadores.

Qualified Teams
The teams (in bold) qualified for 2014 Copa Libertadores qualify directly for the Fourth Stage (round of 16).

A. River Plate was originally qualified as runners-up of the 2013 Campeonato Sergipano. Because of their request to be absent for 2 two years of the Campeonato Sergiano due to financial problems, Lagarto earned their spot.

Draw
A draw by CBF held on January 10, 2014, set the matches for this round. The 81 qualified teams were divided in eight pots (A-H) with 10 teams each. They were divided based on the CBF Rankings and the matches were drawn from the respective confronts: A x E; B x F; C x G; D x H. The lower ranked teams of each match will host the first leg. Before the Round of 16 there will be another draw including the six teams that will play the 2014 Copa Libertadores.

Preliminary round

|}

Preliminary match

Rio Branco won 2–1 on aggregate.

First round

|}

Second round

|}

Third round

|}
Note 1: Novo Hamburgo won on aggregate but was disqualified by the STJD after being punished for fielding an ineligible player.

Copa Sudamericana qualification
The best seven teams eliminated before the Round of 16 with the best 2013 Série A or 2013 Série B record (excluding those qualified for 2014 Copa Libertadores) qualify for 2014 Copa Sudamericana.

1 Sport Recife is qualified as (Brazil 8) in the 2014 Copa Sudamericana, independently of qualifying position of the other seven teams.

Knockout stages

A draw by CBF was held on August 18 to set the matches for this round. The 16 qualified teams were divided in two pots. Teams from pot 1 are the ones who competed at the 2014 Copa Libertadores plus the two highest CBF ranked teams qualified via the Third Round. Pot 2 is composed of the other teams that qualified through the Third Round. Each pot was divided into 4 pairs according to the CBF ranking. That division makes sure that each team within a pair will not face each other before the finals as they will be placed in opposite sides of the bracket. There was a draw to decide the home team of the round of 16. The following stages will have other draws to determine the order of the matches as the tournament advances.

Seeding

Bracket

Round of 16

|}
Note 1: Due to racist chants against Santos' player Aranha by Grêmio fans in the first leg, the STJD suspended the second leg scheduled for September 3 and removed Grêmio from the tournament, thus automatically qualifying Santos to the next round.

Quarterfinals

{{TwoLegResult|ABC|Rio Grande do Norte|3–3 (a)|Cruzeiro|Minas Gerais|0–1|3–2}}

|}

Semifinals

|}

Finals

Top goalscorers
Players and teams in bold''' are still active in the competition.

Notes

References

 
2014
2014 in Brazilian football
2014 domestic association football cups